Pāvilosta is a small port town in South Kurzeme Municipality in the Courland region of Latvia. It is located at the mouth of Saka river. The population in 2020 was 881.

History 
The territory of modern Pāvilosta has been inhabited since the Stone Age. During the late Iron Age and the Livonian crusade the territory was inhabited by Curonians and was part of the Piemare land. In 1253 in an agreement between Bishop of Courland and Livonian Order port at the mouth of Saka river is mentioned for the first time. In the later years small port named Sackenhausen was part of the Bishopric of Courland, Duchy of Courland and Semigallia and since 1795 Russian Empire.

In 1879 local landlord from nearby Upesmuiža manor Otto Friedrich von Lilienfeld started extensive reconstruction works of the small port. The new port town was named Paulshafen, after baron's brother General governor of the Courland Governorate Paul von Lilienfeld. However, development of the town is not so fast as von Lilienfeld has planned. Many building plots are available for rent but during ten years only ten buildings are built. Port is used only by several fishermen and three small sailers owned by nearby manors.

The real development of the town started in 1893 when the building of Liepāja military port (Karosta) started. Pāvilosta became the main centre for transporting stones to the Liepāja. Port was adjusted for stone shipment and many builders, workers and sailors came to the town. When stone shipment stopped town already had good port and shipping infrastructure. Until First World War there were three shipyards in the town where small one mast ships were built. However several bigger two-mast schooners for international voyages also were built in the town. Overall 15 ships were built in the Pāvilosta. In 1913 Pāvilosta received limited town rights.

During the First World War Pāvilosta was occupied by the German Imperial Army and saw heavy destruction. Almost all of the Pāvilosta fleet was destroyed, sold or confiscated. After the war, only two motorboats and four sailors were left in port. In the Republic of Latvia the port shifted its focus from merchant ships to fishery. In 1930 a fishermen cooperative was established in the town. In 1939 a Lutheran church was consecrated in the town.

After the Soviet occupation of Latvia in 1940 all fishermen were forced to unite in artel. During battles in the Courland Pocket several fishermen families fled from the Soviet re-occupation of Latvia in 1944 with motorboats to Gotland, only 150 kilometres to the west. After the war, Pāvilosta became a port town in the Latvian SSR. Local fishermen artel used motor boats until 1949 when the first fishing ship was bought. In 1951 artel was transformed into fishermen kolkhoz Dzintarjūra (Amber sea). In 1975 the kolkhoz was merged with Liepāja fishermen kolkhoz Boļševiks (The Bolshevik). In the 1970s there were around 20 fishing trawlers in Pāvilosta port.

After 1991 Pāvilosta again became part of the Republic of Latvia. It was granted town rights in 1991. In 1994 stock company Pāvilosta was established who today owns two fishing trawlers. Today port is used mainly by local fishermen boats and tourist yachts. There is also sailing, surfing and windsurfing school in the town who owns several yachts.

Gallery

See also
List of cities and towns in Latvia

References

Towns in Latvia
Port cities in Latvia
Port cities and towns of the Baltic Sea
Populated coastal places in Latvia
Populated places established in 1991
1991 establishments in Latvia
South Kurzeme Municipality
Courland